This page lists nationwide public opinion polls that have been conducted relating to the 2016 regional elections in the Czech Republic.

Jihomoravský kraj (South Moravian region)

Moravskoslezský kraj (Moravia-Silesia region)

Olomoucký kraj (Olomouc region)

Zlínský kraj (Zlín region)

Královéhradecký kraj (Hradec Králové region)

Pardubický kraj (Pardubice region)

Středočeský kraj (Central Bohemian region)

Kraj Vysočina (Vysočina region)

Plzeňský kraj Plzeň region)

Jihočeský kraj (South Bohemian region)

Karlovarský kraj (Karlovy Vary region)

Ústecký kraj (Ústí nad Labem region)

Liberecký kraj (Liberec region)

References

Opinion polling for regional elections in the Czech Republic